The Order of Sheikh Isa bin Salman Al Khalifa is a Bahraini order of merit. It is the highest decoration in the Kingdom of Bahrain and is named after Isa bin Salman Al Khalifa, the former Emir of Bahrain.

History
The award was established by King Hamad bin Isa Al Khalifa on October 6, 1999.

Grades
The award has five degrees: premium class, first class, second class, third class, and fourth class. They are awarded in descending order through the following levels:
 Heads of state and government, crown princes, senior members of the House of Khalifa, ministers in the Cabinet of Bahrain, and civilians and military personnel of equivalent status.
 Undersecretaries and assistant undersecretaries of ministries, members of legislative and advisory bodies, and soldiers, civil servants, and businesspeople of equivalent status.
 Military officers and those of similar status who have served the nation.

Notable recipients
 King Salman of Saudi Arabia
 King Abdullah of Saudi Arabia
 Crown Prince of Saudi Arabia and Saudi Minister of Defense Mohammed bin Salman
 President Abdel Fattah el-Sisi of Egypt
 Former President Beji Caid Essebsi of Tunisia
 Vice-President of the United Arab Emirates and Emir of Dubai Mohammed bin Rashid Al Maktoum
 Emir Tamim bin Hamad Al Thani of Qatar
 President Recep Tayyip Erdoğan of Turkey
President Jair Bolsonaro of Brazil
 Sultan Haitham bin Tariq of Oman

References

Civil awards and decorations of Bahrain
Awards established in 1999